The Royal mottos or  of the Norwegian monarchs are an old tradition, permanent since the reign of Christian II of Denmark and Norway. The latest three kings have adopted the same motto as their personal motto, that has a particularly high standing as it became one of the main symbols of the Norwegian struggle during the German occupation of Norway in World War II.

List

See also
List of Norwegian monarchs
Royal mottos of Swedish monarchs
Royal mottos of Danish monarchs

Note: (1) Compare with the motto of the U.S. state of Missouri (1821): "Let the welfare of the people be the supreme law". Originally from Cicero's De Legibus, Book III, Part III, Sub. VIII.
(2) The present royal motto is not easily translated into English: the literal meaning is "All for Norway" but this conveys a sense of "Everything for Norway", as opposed to "Everybody for Norway" (since  is neuter gender, and would rarely refer to people). As such, it conveys a meaning of "Give all for Norway", which is interpreted as the readiness (of the sovereign, but maybe also his subjects) to give up or sacrifice everything for Norway.

Norwegian monarchy
Norway